The 2000 Asian Men’s Club Volleyball Championship was the 2nd staging of the AVC Club Championships. The tournament was held in Suphanburi, Thailand. Samsung Fire & Marine Insurance of Korea won the tournament after beating Paykan of Tehran, Iran.

Preliminary round

Pool A 

|}

|}

Pool B

|}

|}

Classification 5th–8th

Semifinals

|}

7th place

|}

5th place

|}

Final round

Semifinals

|}

3rd place

|}

Final

|}

Final standing

Awards
MVP:  Kim Se-jin (Samsung)
Best Scorer:  Behnam Mahmoudi (Paykan)
Best Spiker:  Kim Se-jin (Samsung)
Best Blocker:  Keivan Mojarradi (Paykan)
Best Receiver:  Wan Hong (Jin Han Wang)
Best Setter:  Bang Ji-sub (Samsung)

References
Asian Volleyball Confederation
  Results

2000
2000 in volleyball
International volleyball competitions hosted by Thailand
V
Sport in Suphan Buri province